The Spirit of '76 was the first microprocessor-based pinball table. It was released by Mirco Games, Inc. in July 4 1975. The pinball machine should not be confused with the pinball machine Spirit of 76 by Gottlieb.

Technology
The table was based on the technology Dave Nutting Associates had created for Bally in 1974. The firm licensed the technology to Mirco Games in 1975 to create the table, since Bally was not initially interested in the system. The table had a fairly small production run and was regarded as having an unattractive design by critics.

The CPU is a Motorola 6800 with a single 6820 used for I/O. The program memory is stored in ten 512 x 4 bit bipolar PROMs which is no more than 2.5 Kbytes of program memory. RAM is 256 bytes, using two 2112 static RAMs. The CPU, score LED's, backbox displays, and lamp and solenoid drivers are all contained on the main board. The cabinet contains the power supply, and EM-style chime unit.

References

External links
The Spirit of '76 on Arcade Archive
The Spirit of '76 on the Internet Pinball Database
Recent Auction Results for The Spirit of '76

1975 pinball machines